Frances Taylor Davis (September 28, 1929 – November 17, 2018) was an American dancer and actress who was a member of the Katherine Dunham Company, and the first African American ballerina to perform with the Paris Opera Ballet.

Credited as Elizabeth Taylor, she had roles in the Broadway musicals Mr. Wonderful, Shinbone Alley, and was an original cast member of West Side Story. Taylor also appeared in the Off-Broadway productions of Carmen Jones and Porgy and Bess. At the peak of her career, she left Broadway to marry jazz musician Miles Davis.

Life and career

Early life 
Taylor was born on September 28, 1929 in Chicago, Illinois. Taylor grew up in the Rosenwald Courts in Chicago. Her father worked at the post office. She began dancing classical ballet at the age of 8, and by the age of 16 she was performing Swan Lake. Her instructor encouraged her to audition for the Edna McRae School of the Dance where she became the only African American student. While attending the school, Taylor met dancer and choreographer Katherine Dunham who offered her a scholarship to study dance at the Katherine Dunham Company. Taylor finished high school then briefly attended college, but decided to pursue a dancing career instead.

Career 
Taylor joined the Katherine Dunham Company, where she was taught by Walter Nicks. She trained and toured extensively with the dance company in Europe and South America. In 1948, Taylor was recruited for a special presentation to perform with the Paris Opera Ballet, becoming the first African American to be invited to perform with the ballet company. Taylor received rave reviews from the press for her performances in Paris. She was compared to French ballet dancer Leslie Caron. She performed with Benny Goodman at the London Palladium. While in London, Taylor rehearsed with Sadler's Wells Ballet.

In 1953, Taylor was asked by Sammy Davis Jr. to appear as his girlfriend in his ill-fated ABC television show, Three for the Road — with the Will Mastin Trio. They had met at Ciro's nightclub where she was performing with the Katherine Dunham dance troupe. The show was about struggling musicians, not the usual stereotypical portrayals of African Americans during that time. The cast included actresses Ruth Attaway and Jane White, and Frederick O'Neal who founded the American Negro Theater. They filmed a pilot in the fall of 1953, but the network couldn't get a sponsor, so the show was postponed and eventually dropped.

In 1954, Taylor rejoined the Katherine Dunham dance troupe as one of Dunham's lead dancers for engagements in Rome. Taylor relocated to New York City to act on Broadway. She was credited as Elizabeth Taylor because there was already an actress named Frances Taylor, so she used her middle name. Taylor appeared in the Off-Broadway productions of Porgy and Bess and Carmen Jones at New York City Center. She appeared in the three Broadway musicals: Mr. Wonderful, Shinbone Alley, and West Side Story. On the opening night of West Side Story in September 1957, Taylor received the company's "gypsy robe" for being the outstanding dancer in the cast. In April 1958, it was reported by Jet magazine that Taylor quit the production to pursue a singing-dancing career, but Taylor later revealed that she was dating jazz musician Miles Davis who forced her to quit the production in March 1958. According to Taylor, Davis told her "a woman should be with her man. I want you out of West Side Story."

In 1959, Davis allowed Taylor to conduct her own dancing classes for awhile. Her students included Julie Robinson, who was a Dunham trouper and the wife of actor Harry Belafonte, and Edna Mae Robinson, who was a chorine and the wife of boxer Sugar Ray Robinson.

When Taylor married Davis in December 1959, he prevented her from working which hindered her career. Choreographer Jerome Robbins who Taylor had worked with in the Broadway musical West Side Story asked Davis if she could appear in the film West Side Story (1961); he refused. Sammy Davis Jr. approached Davis about Taylor appearing in the musical Golden Boy (1964); again he refused.

Following her split from Davis in 1965, Taylor taught private dance classes, appeared in television specials with performers such as Elvis Presley, and had a role as the maid in the film The Party (1968).

After Taylor retired, she became a restaurant hostess in Los Angeles. She worked at Hamburger Hamlet, Roy's Restaurant, Le Dome, and Chasen's.

Personal life 
Taylor first met Davis when she was dancing at Ciro's nightclub in Los Angeles in 1953. When she traveled back to Chicago, Davis was also in town for gigs. Taylor introduced Davis to her family and he asked her father for her hand in marriage to which he said, "No." Taylor also rejected his proposal. Instead, Taylor married Jean-Marie Durand in Mexico City in 1955 where they were both performing. Durand was of Haitian descent and also a member of the Katherine Dunham's dance troupe; they met in Argentina in 1954. Following the marriage, she left the troupe and gave birth to a son, Jean-Pierre Durand. After Taylor separated from her husband, she ran into Davis in New York City in 1957 and he told her, "Now that I've found you, I'll never let you go."

Taylor and Davis were married in Toledo, Ohio on December 21, 1959. She became his muse, influencing his change in musical direction. He wrote the song for her called "Fran Dance" on his album Jazz Track (1959). Her role in the musical Porgy and Bess inspired his album Porgy and Bess (1959). His album Sketches of Spain (1960) was inspired by a flamenco performance Taylor insisted they attend. Davis also put Taylor on the cover of multiple albums, including Someday My Prince Will Come (1961). However, their marriage was marred by domestic violence. Davis became increasingly violent towards Taylor as his cocaine addiction and alcohol abuse worsened. "Every time I hit her, I felt bad because a lot of it really wasn’t her fault but had to do with me being temperamental and jealous," Davis wrote in his 1990 memoir Miles: The Autobiography. Shortly after Taylor and Davis were photographed together for the cover of his album E.S.P. (1965), she fled from him and went to stay with her friend, singer Nancy Wilson in California. Taylor filed for divorce in 1966; it was finalized in 1968. She was one of the interviewees for the documentary Miles Davis: Birth of the Cool; it was released posthumously in 2019.

Taylor had a relationship with George Barrie, CEO of Fabergé.

In 1990, Taylor filed a lawsuit charging her long-time friend Eartha Kitt with assault and battery. Taylor alleged that Kitt attacked her after they had drinks at the Hollywood Roosevelt Hotel.

Death 
Taylor died at the age of 89 on November 17, 2018. She was survived by her son Jean-Pierre Durand, step-daughter Cheryl Davis, grandchildren, and great-grandchildren.

Filmography

Stage

References

External links 

Elizabeth Taylor on Broadway World
Frances Davis: Her Story - Life before & after Miles

1929 births
2018 deaths
Actresses from Chicago
American female dancers
Paris Opera Ballet dancers
African-American ballet dancers
American musical theatre actresses
African-American choreographers
American women choreographers
American choreographers
American ballerinas
Dancers from Illinois
Muses
African-American women musicians
20th-century American ballet dancers